Stephen Curry: Underrated is a 2023 American sports documentary film about basketball star Stephen Curry.  The film was directed by Peter Nicks, and it premiered at the 2023 Sundance Film Festival before being released on Apple TV+.

Synopsis 
The film follows the career of basketball star Stephen Curry from his 2008 NCAA Tournament run with Davidson College through the 2021–22 Golden State Warriors run at another NBA Championship, where Curry also received the NBA Finals Most Valuable Player Award.

Production 
A24 green-lit production of Stephen Curry: Underrated in August 2021 with Peter Nicks directing and producing the first project in the first-look deal between Unanimous Media and A24. In October 2022, Apple joined the project to have it as one of their Apple Original Films.

Release 
The film had its premiere on January 23, 2023, at the Sundance Film Festival.

Reception

References

External links 
 

2023 documentary films
A24 (company) films
2020s sports films